I. laeta may refer to:

 Incaspiza laeta, a bird endemic to Peru
 Ipomoea laeta, a morning glory